Michael Espendiller (born 5 May 1989) is a German politician for the populist Alternative for Germany and since 2017 member of the Bundestag.

Life and politics

Espendiller was born 1989 in the West German town of Leonberg and studied Mathematics and macroeconomics at the University of Münster. 

He achieved his Dr. rer. nat. in 2017.

Espendiller entered the newly founded AfD in 2013 and after the 2017 German federal election he became member of the bundestag and Parlamentarischer Geschäftsführer (parliamentary managing secretary) of his party's group.

Espendiller denies the scientific consensus on climate change.

References

Living people
1989 births
People from Leonberg
University of Münster alumni
Members of the Bundestag 2017–2021
Members of the Bundestag 2021–2025
Members of the Bundestag for the Alternative for Germany